Peter Nick (born  1 October 1962 in Leutkirch im Allgäu) is a German molecular biologist, and head of Molecular Cell Biology at the Karlsruhe Institute of Technology (KIT), and long-standing Academic Dean for Chemistry und Biology, He was co-initiator of the Forum for Critical Transdisciplinary Studies (FKI) and recipient of the State Teaching Award of Baden-Württemberg in 2015.

Biography 
After primary school in Schloss Zeil  and secondary school Leutkirch in Allgäu until 1981 Nick studied biology at the Albert-Ludwigs-University Freiburg (1981–1986) with an exchange semester at the  University of St Andrews in Scotland.

He passed diploma exams in biology in Freiburg and obtained a doctorate in 1990 with the grade summa cum laude. After research visits to the Frontier Research-Program, Wako-shi in Japan and the CNRS-IBMP in Strasbourg, he was appointed professor with Venia legendi in botany in 1996. As assistant and senior assistant at the Institute of Botany II in Freiburg he became youth research leader of the project „Dynamics of the plant cell skeleton – molecular cell biology in vivo“, which had been set up by the VW foundation, in 1999.

In 2003 Nick was appointed professor of molecular cell biology at the University of Karlsruhe at the Botanical Institut 1, and became its head in 1995. From 2004 until 2014 he was in addition academic dean at the Faculty of Chemistry und Biological Sciences. He refused positions at the universities of Frankfurt, Darmstadt und Salzburg.

He received the State Award Baden-Württemberg together with Mathias Gutmann 2015 for the Initiative Forum for Critical Transdisciplinary Studies (FKI).

Nick is married with two children.

Honors 
 1981: Winner of the Baden-Württemberg State Award for Youth Research
 1981–1990: Stipendium and doctoral stipendium of the German National Academic Foundation
 1990–1992: Stipendium at the Science and Technology Agency, Japan
 1992–1994: Stipendium at the Human Frontier Science Program Organization
 1994–1996: Professorship stipendium of the German Research Foundation
 1999–2004: Youth group of the Volkswagen Foundation 
 2007: Teaching Award of the Faculty of Chemistry und Biological Sciences, TU Karlsruhe
 2014: Teaching Award of the Faculty of Chemistry und Biological Sciences, KIT
 2015: Teaching Award of the State of Baden-Wuerttemberg
 2016: Member of the Vitifutur Intereg Project

Publications (selection) 
 1985 Bachelor Sci. Thesisː „Heterophylly in a Potamogeton Species“
 1986 Diplomarbeitː „Photogravitropism and Polarity in maize kernels“
 1990 Dissertationː „Experiments on Tropism, Cross Polarity and Microtubules“
 1996 Professorial Thesisː „Single Cells and Plant Form“
 2003 editor-in-chief of PROTOPLASMA
 2005 Professor and Head of the Botanical Institute 1, Karlsruhe
 2011 Series Editor Plant Cell Monographs (Springer)

See also 
 Publication List of Peter Nick at Botanik KIT

References

External links 
 Botanical Institute KIT
 Forum for Critical Interdisciplinary Research (FKI)
 Peter Nick, Deutsche Botanische Gesellschaft
 Peter Nick on the Webpage Deutsche Forschungsgemeinschaft
 Peter Nick, Genetic resources viticula
  Peter Nick Microtubules as Sensors for abiotic Stimuli
 Microtubules and the tax payer
 Dual targeting of plastid division protein FtsZ to chloroplasts and the cytoplasm
 Propagation mechanischer Impulse durch synthetisierte Biopolymer-Netzwerke mit optisch gefangenen Ankerpunkten
 BNN:  Peter Nick concerning resistance in Viticulture
 Bioökonomie and Viticulture by Peter Nick
 Mainpost concerning research by Peter Nick
 Pharmazeutische Zeitung: Peter Nick and Superfood

1962 births
Living people
People from Leutkirch im Allgäu
21st-century German biologists
Academic staff of the Karlsruhe Institute of Technology